Dharmavaram Municipality is the local self-government of the city of Dharmavaram, located in the Indian state of Andhra Pradesh. It is classified as a selection grade municipality.

History 
The municipality was formed in 1964. along with the Kadiri Municipality in Anantapur District

Administration
The present chairperson of the municipality is Lingam Nirmala and the commissioner is B.Rama Mohan.

Awards and achievements
In 2015, it is one among the 31 cities in the state to be a part of water supply and sewerage services mission known as Atal Mission for Rejuvenation and Urban Transformation (AMRUT). In 2015, as per the Swachh Bharat Abhiyan of the Ministry of Urban Development, Dharmavaram Municipality was ranked 224th in the country.

See also
 List of municipalities in Andhra Pradesh

References

1964 establishments in Andhra Pradesh
Government agencies established in 1964
Municipalities of Andhra Pradesh
Urban local bodies in Andhra Pradesh